Hey Love is the eighth studio album by Canadian singer-songwriter Hayden, released March 24, 2015 on Arts & Crafts.  The first single "Nowhere We Cannot Go" was released on January 28, 2015.

Track listing

References 

Hayden (musician) albums
2015 albums
Arts & Crafts Productions albums